Jefferson Township is one of twelve townships in Jay County, Indiana, United States. As of the 2010 census, its population was 770 and it contained 309 housing units.

History
Jefferson Township was organized in 1837.

Geography
The streams of Bost Run, Como Run, Jeff Run, Jutte Run, New Mount Run and Vale Run run through this township.

Unincorporated towns
 Como
 New Mount Pleasant
 Powers

Adjacent townships
 Greene Township (north)
 Wayne Township (northeast)
 Pike Township (east)
 Ward Township, Randolph County (southeast)
 Franklin Township, Randolph County (south)
 Green Township, Randolph County (southwest)
 Richland Township (west)
 Knox Township (northwest)

Cemeteries
The township contains seven cemeteries: Bost, Flesher, New Mount Pleasant, Powers, Stephens, Stratton and Wentz.

Major highways

Airports and landing strips
 Windy P Ridge Airport

References
 
 United States Census Bureau cartographic boundary files

External links
 Indiana Township Association
 United Township Association of Indiana

Townships in Jay County, Indiana
Townships in Indiana
Populated places established in 1837
1837 establishments in Indiana